Frank Prescott (1922 – 1969) was an English footballer, who played as a centre forward in the Football League for Tranmere Rovers.

References

Tranmere Rovers F.C. players
Association football forwards
English Football League players
1922 births
1969 deaths
People from Birkenhead
English footballers